Joy is an unincorporated community in Kiowa County, Kansas, United States.

Geography
Joy is located on 19th Avenue next to the railroad between Greensburg and Mullinville.

Economy
Joy has one business, a tall concrete grain elevator, otherwise the former community doesn't currently have any other buildings.

Education
The community is served by Kiowa County USD 422 public school district.

References

Further reading

External links
 Kiowa County maps: Current, Historic, KDOT

Unincorporated communities in Kansas
Unincorporated communities in Kiowa County, Kansas